RV Kilo Moana (AGOR-26) is a small waterplane area twin hull (SWATH) oceanographic research ship owned by the US Navy and operated by the University of Hawaii as a part of the University-National Oceanographic Laboratory System (UNOLS) fleet. She was designed to operate in coastal and blue water areas. The unique SWATH hull-form provides a comfortable, stable platform in high sea conditions.

In January 2012 Kilo Moana began taking on water from a baseball sized hole in her hull.  The crew of the vessel along with the United States Coast Guard were able to temporarily plug the hole and pump out the flooded spaces. She returned to her homeport of Honolulu safely and entered emergency drydock to repair the damaged hull. 

On 20 November 2019, the ship rescued a French-flagged sail catamaran Thetis. That ship with a crew of four was transiting the Austral Islands in French Polynesia when she began to take on water. The American vessel was able to fabricate parts needed to restore watertight integrity and the Thetis was able to continue her passage.

Construction
Kilo Moana was built by Atlantic Marine  Jacksonville, Florida, for the Office of Naval Research. She was laid down on 9 February 2001 and launched on 17 November 2001.

See also 
 Oceanography

References

 University of Hawaii Marine Operations(UHMO)
  UHMO: R/V Kilo Moana
 Photo Gallery Of the R/V Kilo Moana
 

 

University-National Oceanographic Laboratory System research vessels
Oceanographic research ships of the United States Navy
Small waterplane area twin hull vessels
Ships built in Mobile, Alabama
2001 ships
University of Hawaiʻi
Military catamarans